Metarctia rubra is a moth of the subfamily Arctiinae. It was described by Francis Walker in 1856. It is found in Angola, Malawi and South Africa.

References

 

Metarctia
Moths described in 1856